CM101MMXI Fundamentals is a 2011 Turkish stand up comedy directed by Murat Dündar. The theatrical release of the show was in 2013. In the first week, the movie attracted an audience of more than 600,000 people.

References

External links 
 
 

2013 films
Turkish comedy films
2010s Turkish-language films
Films set in Turkey
2013 comedy films